Paul Wontorek (born c. 1972/1973) is an American theater personality, journalist, host and editor-in-chief at Broadway.com.

Early life and education 
Wontorek grew up in New Haven, Connecticut and was involved in theater during high school. At 18, he began school at Fordham University in New York City as a journalism major and wrote for the school's newspaper, The Fordham Observer. In 1991, he interned at TheaterWeek magazine. After graduating, Wontorek worked as a graphic designer. Concurrently, he founded the musical-theater magazine, Upstage.

Career 
Early in his career, Wontorek was a freelance reporter for InTheater Magazine and Entertainment Weekly. He also worked as a stage manager on small musical theater productions in New York and was contracted for design work for various cast albums. In 2010, Broadway.com was bought by Key Brand Entertainment from Hollywood Media Corp for approximately $45 million.

Wontorek runs editorial at Broadway.com. He hosts the online shows Show People with Paul Wontorek and The Broadway.com Show.

Wontorek made his Broadway debut in The Prom, opening the May 14, 2019 performance. He replaced the Broadway red carpet reporter character Olivia Keating, normally played by cast member Courtney Balan, interviewing Dee Dee Allen (Beth Leavel) at opening night of her musical Eleanor: The Eleanor Roosevelt Musical.

References

Living people
Journalists from New York City
American theater critics
Fordham University alumni
Year of birth missing (living people)